Besagews, also spelled besagues, are a type of rondel designed to protect the armpits, as part of a harness of plate armour. The armpits are the location of the axillary arteries, and protecting them was therefore vital. Armour without besagues might employ larger shoulder defenses, such as winged pauldrons, or simply leave the mail beneath exposed.

References
 Edge, David and Paddock, John (1988). Arms & Armor of the Medieval Knight, New York: Crescent Books. 

Western plate armour